Francisco Bobadilla (died 29 August 1529) was a Roman Catholic prelate who served as Bishop of Salamanca (1510–1529) and Bishop of Ciudad Rodrigo (1509–1510).

Biography
On 22 January 1509 Francisco Bobadilla was selected by the King of Spain and confirmed by Pope Julius II as Bishop of Ciudad Rodrigo. On 18 November 1510 he was appointed by the King of Spain and confirmed by Pope Julius II as Bishop of Salamanca. He served as Bishop of Salamanca until his death on 29 August 1529. While Bishop, he was the principal consecrator of Vicente de Peraza, Bishop of Panamá (1521).

See also 
Catholic Church in Spain

References

External links and additional sources
 (for Chronology of Bishops) 
 (for Chronology of Bishops) 

1656 deaths
16th-century Roman Catholic archbishops in Spain
Bishops appointed by Pope Julius II